"When You Really Loved Someone" is a song by Swedish recording artist and current ABBA member Agnetha Fältskog. On  it was internationally released as the first single from her fifth English solo album, A.

General information

"When You Really Loved Someone" was by written and produced by Swedish songwriter and producer Jörgen Elofsson. The sound of the song and the album can be described as "very mature and worthy", according to Fältskog herself. Featuring all elements that make the song fit into the category mostly described as "power ballad", it also shows some surprising synth elements in the latter half.

"When You Really Loved Someone" is the first digital single by Fältskog. While initially no physical release of the song had been planned, high demand from fans apparently was the reason Universal Music eventually released "When You Really Loved Someone" on a 1-track CD single on April 15 and later as a limited edition 7" picture disc.

Critical reception

Upon its release, the single received a lot of media coverage, mostly in the context of Fältskog's musical comeback and news about the forthcoming album. The Swedish media reviewed the song, calling it an "epic ballad", and highlighting its acoustic elements, like strings, guitars as well as the sweet harmonies.
Swedish newspaper Aftonbladet pointed out the contrast between production and musical elements from the 1970s and the synth-loop in the latter half of the song, which would also suit for the likes of Britney Spears. Online portal Musikindustrin referred to these elements as "charming 80's synths".

Promotional video
In order to promote the song, a video for "When You Really Loved Someone" was shot, featuring Fältskog herself as well as actors Max Fowler and Camilla Rowland. The scenes with Agnetha Fältskog were shot at Ulriksdal Palace, the same location as the shooting of most promotion pictures for Fältskog's current album project. Rowland, who apparently plays a young Fältskog, and Fowler, portraying her lover, shot their scenes in London. The video was directed by Simon Fowler, produced by Beau Fowler and designed by Blair Barnette.

Remixes

Two official remixes of "When You Really Loved Someone" were made available.

Formats and track listing

Chart performance

In the days after its release, "When You Really Loved Someone" entered the Swedish iTunes top10, peaking at number 3 behind the winner of Melodifestivalen 2013, Robin Stjernberg with his song You. As a result of its good performance in the daily iTunes chart, the song eventually entered the Swedish DigiListan download chart at number 4 on March 24.

In the end of April, BBC Radio 2 made "When You Really Loved Someone" Record of the Week and subsequently placed the song in its A List, which meant that it would be played between 15 and 20 times per week. As a result, "When You Really Loved Someone" started rising in the UK Airplay Chart, eventually entering the top 30 in the first week of May 2013 with 273 plays and 23.89m impacts.

Weekly charts

Radio and release history

References 

2013 singles
Agnetha Fältskog songs
Songs written by Jörgen Elofsson
2013 songs